AeroSvit Airlines private stock company, operating as AeroSvit — Ukrainian Airlines / АероСвіт, was a Ukrainian private airline. Its head office was on the grounds of the Boryspil International Airport in Boryspil.

Aerosvit Ukrainian Airlines was a member of IATA and an IATA IOSA certified carrier. Its main base was the Boryspil Airport. The airline was established in March 1994 and started operations in April the same year with international flights from Kyiv in co-operation with Air Ukraine. , Aerosvit was the largest carrier in Ukraine. Bankruptcy procedures began in January 2013, and in February 2013, AeroSvit ceased operations.

History

Early years

The airline was established on 25 March 1994, and started operations in  that year with flights from Kyiv to Athens, Larnaca, Tel Aviv, Odesa and Thessaloniki in co-operation with Air Ukraine. In  the same year, the carrier started dry-leasing some Boeing 737-200s in connection with the addition of Moscow into the route network. In 1995, new scheduled flights from Kyiv to Almaty, Ashgabad, and Riga were launched, laying the foundations for it to become a transit airline. In 1996, Yekaterinburg, Kharkiv, Lviv, and Simferopol were added to the airline's network. Also in 1996, the airline became a member of the International Air Transport Association (IATA). By 1997, Aerosvit Airlines became a member of IATA Clearing House and purchased its first Boeing 737-200 aircraft. By 1999, Aerosvit had acquired a third Boeing 737-200 aircraft and scheduled flights to Budapest, Sofia and Istanbul were launched.

Post-millennium expansion and reorganisation
In 2000, two more Boeing 737-300 aircraft joined Aerosvit Airlines' fleet. Scheduled flights to Prague and Warsaw were launched, and Aerosvit Airlines carried more passengers than any other Ukrainian airline (over the calendar year). In 2002, a further three Boeing 737-500 aircraft joined the fleet, as also did the first Boeing 767-300ER —a 350-seater machine that previously belonged to SAS— on a long-term lease from Boeing Capital, aimed at starting operations to Bangkok. The airliner became the first Western-built wide-body one to be operated by a Ukrainian carrier. Also in 2002, Aerosvit took over the long-haul services previously operated by Air Ukraine.

The Kyiv–New York–Kyiv route was launched in 2003 with a twice weekly service. Later that year, flights to Toronto and Delhi began. In this year, the airline also carried its second millionth passenger. Soon after JAR-145 certification for performing in house maintenance works in accordance with the European Joint Aviation Authorities' requirements was received. With the onset of 2004, Aerosvit increased the number of weekly flights it operated to Bangkok to three and an additional Boeing 737-300 was added to the fleet. Route expansion continued as before, and over the course of the year the number of Aerosvit-operated domestic flights across Ukraine expanded to eleven destinations. However, expansion did not just take place on the domestic market, as Aerosvit introduced new routes from its base in Kyiv, to Beijing, Baku, Chisinau, Cairo, and St. Petersburg. Finally, in 2004, Aerosvit Ukrainian Airlines became the official air carrier of the National Olympic team of Ukraine for the XXVIII Olympic Summer Games held in 2004 in Athens.

Aerosvit's ninth Boeing 737 mid-haul aircraft started operating in 2005, with a tenth being added to the fleet soon after. In the same year, e-ticketing was launched on the route New York-Kyiv and Aerosvit Ukrainian Airlines and Azerbaijan Airlines started code-sharing on the Kyiv-Baku route.

In 2006, the carrier became the  worldwide in passing the IATA Operational Safety Audit. In  that year, Naples was added to the route network, and in  the Kyiv–Vilnius and Simferopol–Vilnius routes were launched in codeshare agreement with Lithuania's national carrier flyLAL.

In 2007, due to cooperation with Delta Air Lines, the number of destinations in the United States increased, allowing onward travel from New York to cities such as Los Angeles and Portland. It was in the same year that Aerosvit Ukrainian Airlines and Donbassaero began to build (at the initiative of their joint main shareholder Privat Group) the strategic alliance Ukrainian Aviation Group. Also, in this year, the fleet was supplemented with a third long haul aircraft Boeing 767 and eleventh and twelfth mid-range Boeing 737s, whilst the start of code share flights with Belavia on the Kyiv-Minsk route took place. In , it was announced that a contract was signed with Boeing for the acquisition of seven Boeing 737-800s and purchase rights for another seven; in a deal valued at more than  million, the operation marked the company's first direct purchase of aircraft since its foundation. In , the airline began the commercialisation of e-tickets on its website.

At the beginning of 2008, flights from Kyiv to Tbilisi and Almaty were launched by Aerosvit, E-ticketing was introduced on all Aerosvit scheduled flights, and Aerosvit Airlines again became the official air carrier of the Ukrainian National Olympic team for the XXIX Olympic Games held in Beijing.

The Ukrainian Aviation Group and modern era

In 2010, Aerosvit added a second Antonov 148 aircraft to its fleet and new routes including Odesa-Kaliningrad, Simferopol-Kaliningrad, Donetsk-Saint Petersburg, Odesa-Riga, and Dnipro-Berlin were opened (largely with the cooperation of its sister companies Dniproavia and Donbassaero) by the carrier. An Odesa-Milan code-share route was launched. Dniproavia, having come into the Privat Group's business portfolio, joined the Ukrainian Aviation Group.

During 2010, the airline opened 21 new international routes, including Bucharest and Yerevan, and signed a codeshare agreement with Hainan Airlines that covered operations on the Kyiv–Beijing route. Aerosvit took delivery of its first Boeing 737-800 in March 2012.

Additionally, Aerosvit signed a contract with Boeing for delivery of 4 Boeing 737-900ER aircraft in 2013-2014, and a fourth Boeing 767 was added to the fleet. In the first quarter of 2012, the airline received the first of its ordered Embraer 190 aircraft, with deliveries continuing into 2013 or 2014.

As of 25 March 2012, as a result of the Anti-monopoly committee of Ukraine's decision to allow the consolidation of the Ukrainian Aviation Group's physical and operational assets, Donbassaero and Dniproavia no longer operate flights with their own codes, but rather on behalf of their parent company Aerosvit.

By June 2012, the airline introduced their first Embraer 190. All Embraer 190 are ordered and operated by the partner-airline Dniproavia.

Financial difficulties and downfall

, debt was  million (around €403 million), thrice the value of company assets (€138.7 million). The airline had not reported the 2012 results, but losses mounted to UAH 1,456 billion in 2011, a threefold increase year-on-year. Aerosvit's last profitable year was 2007.

On 29 December 2012, Aerosvit filed for bankruptcy but intended to restructure and continue to operate. Large minority shareholders claimed they were not informed about the filing. Days prior to initiating the legal procedure, Aerosvit disclosed plans to transfer a number of its international routes to Ukraine International Airlines. After the bankruptcy proceedings were announced, the carrier's aircraft were detained at various airports, leaving hundreds of passengers stranded. In mid-, Rosaviatsia stated that it would ban the airline over a  million debt; late that month, Russia barred the airline from operating in its territory. , the company stated that all the Boeing 737s were being returned to the lessors, as well as one Boeing 767.

Part of Aerosvit's fleet was transferred to Ukraine International Airlines.

Destinations

Codeshare agreements
Aerosvit codeshared with the following airlines (as of December 2012):

Fleet

, Aerosvit Airlines had no active aircraft in its fleet. The airline operated the following aircraft throughout its history:

Airbus A320-200
Antonov An-148
Antonov An-24RV
Antonov An-24B
ATR 72-200
Embraer 190
Boeing 737-200
Boeing 737-300
Boeing 737-400
Boeing 737-500
Boeing 737-700
Boeing 737-800
Boeing 767-300ER
Tupolev Tu-134

Domestic flights
Since 2002, AeroSvit Airlines executed the social priority program of domestic, intra-Ukrainian air carriage, operating scheduled flights that connect Dnipro, Odesa, and Simferopol’ with the capital of Ukraine. In 2003-2004, AeroSvit Airlines' domestic network expanded to Donetsk, Kharkiv, Lviv, and Ivano-Frankivsk. With the domestic flights program, flight safety, high regularity of flights, and a high level of service all became priority areas. Special standards of domestic flights were developed, such as making special menus available on all flights. In 2004 establishment of close cooperation with other Ukrainian airlines supplemented AeroSvit Airlines' own route network with such destinations as Uzhgorod, Chernivtsi, Luhansk, and Zaporizhzhia.

AeroSvit and its Ukrainian Aviation Group partners flew to the Ukrainian cities of Donetsk, Odesa, Simferopol, Dnipro, Kharkiv, Ivano-Frankivsk, Uzhgorod, Chernivtsi, Luhansk, and Sevastopol.

Non-scheduled (charter) flights
Another area of focus for AeroSvit Airlines was non-scheduled or charter, air carriage.
From 1994-2004, AeroSvit Airlines organized charter programs and performed single ad hoc flights for various customers.

Aerosvit's charter activities began with summer-only flights to the Greek island of Crete. Since 1998, AeroSvit Airlines had increased its charter flights offerings. In 1998, the first flights to Antalya (Turkey) began. In early 1999, AeroSvit Airlines opened a new charter route to Hurghada (Egypt). Since 1999, new charter flights to Bulgaria, Turkey, Egypt, Greece, Tunis, and other countries had been added. 
AeroSvit Airlines increased its volume of charter air carriage considerably. In addition to flights to traditional summer resorts, AeroSvit Airlines flew to winter skiing resorts in Austria, France, Finland, Turkey, and Slovakia.

After AeroSvit Airlines added Boeing 767-300ER's to its fleet, charter flights to the Maldives, Tenerife, the Dominican Republic, Indonesia and other locales were added.

Traffic and statistics

Corporate affairs and identity

Subsidiaries

 Dniproavia, an airline headquartered in Dnipro, which participated in the Ukrainian Aviation Group and operated flights under Aerosvit's VV code.
 Donbassaero, was an airline headquartered in Donetsk, which participated in the Ukrainian Aviation Group and operated scheduled flights under Aerosvit's VV code.

Liveries and logo
Aerosvit's last livery was a Euro-white scheme, comprising a white fuselage with the blue Aerosvit title and design. The tail was white with a blue bird wing inside the yellow circle and the small Ukrainian flag at the top. The wing became a symbol of the company and inspired the name of Aerosvit Airlines.
In 2011, a common Alliance livery was unveiled.

International cooperation
AeroSvit was a member of the following international organizations:
 International Air Transport Association (IATA), including BSP
 Association of European Airlines (AEA)
 European Business Association (EBA)
 U.S.-Ukraine Business Council (USUBC)
 International Chamber of Commerce in Ukraine (ICCU)
 Kyiv Chamber of Commerce and Industry
 Association of Ukrainian-Chinese Cooperation (AUCC)

Incidents and accidents
On 17 December 1997, Aerosvit Flight 241, a Yakovlev Yak-42, crashed near Thessaloniki, Greece; all 62 passengers and 8 crew members died.

See also

List of airlines of Ukraine
Transport in Ukraine

References

External links

 Official website at archive.org 

Defunct airlines of Ukraine
Former Association of European Airlines members
Airlines established in 1994
Airlines disestablished in 2013
Ukrainian brands
Privat Group
Ukrainian companies established in 1994
2013 disestablishments in Ukraine